Magali Harvey (born August 16, 1990) is a Canadian rugby union player.

Rugby career

Harvey represented  at the 2014 Women's Rugby World Cup. She was named IRB Women’s Player of the Year 2014 and was the first Canadian to receive the award.

She won a gold medal at the 2015 Pan American Games as a member of the Canadian women's rugby sevens team.

Honors 
 2014, WRWC Dream Team
 2014, International Rugby Players Women’s 15s Try of the Decade
 2014, IRB Women's Player of the year
 2020, World Rugby Player of the Decade in 15-a-side rugby (nominee)

Personal

Harvey started playing at the age of 18 and played at St. Francis Xavier University during her university career. She studied Business Administration. Her father, Luc Harvey was the former Member of Parliament for the riding of Louis-Hébert in Quebec from 2006 to 2008.

References

External links
 
 Player profile at Rugby Canada 

1990 births
Living people
Sportspeople from Quebec City
Canadian female rugby union players
Canada women's international rugby union players
Canada international rugby sevens players
Female rugby sevens players
Rugby sevens players at the 2015 Pan American Games
Pan American Games gold medalists for Canada
Pan American Games medalists in rugby sevens
Medalists at the 2015 Pan American Games
Canada international women's rugby sevens players